Safehouse Records is an American record label created by artists Demi Lovato, Nick Jonas and his manager Phil McIntyre that existed until the late 2010s. Announced on May 26, 2015, its goal was to "put artists in control of their art while providing them the best tools to manage their careers." The first official album to be released from the label was Lovato's fifth studio album, Confident (2015), followed by Nick Jonas X2, the re-issue of Jonas' self-titled second album. On December 15, 2015, it was announced the record label signed a joint deal with Universal Music Publishing Group, and also welcomed Chord Overstreet to a publishing deal, as part of Safehouse Publishing.

Artists
Nick Jonas
Demi Lovato
Chord Overstreet

References

Safehouse Records
American record labels
Defunct record labels of the United States
Demi Lovato
Hollywood Records
Island Records
Labels distributed by Universal Music Group
Nick Jonas
Record labels established in 2015
Universal Music Group